James Crawford (1874 – 1949) was a Scottish professional footballer who played as a winger for Sunderland.

References

1870s births
Year of death unknown
People from Leith
Footballers from Edinburgh
Association football wingers
Rangers F.C. players
Abercorn F.C. players
Sunderland A.F.C. players
Derby County F.C. players
Middlesbrough F.C. players
English Football League players
Scottish footballers